This is a list of notable major productions of the ballet Swan Lake. Throughout the long and complex performance history of Swan Lake, the 1895 edition of Marius Petipa, Lev Ivanov, and Riccardo Drigo has served as the definitive version on which nearly every staging has been based, having been mounted by many noted ballet masters and choreographers from the late 19th century until the present day.

Notable Swan Lake ballets 
 1888: Augustin Berger – Prague National Theatre (Act II only)
 1901: Alexander Gorsky – Bolshoi Ballet, Moscow
 1907: Achille Viscusi – Prague National Theatre, Prague
 1910: Mikhail Fokine – Ballets Russes, London
 1911: Mikhail Mordkin – All Star Imperial Russian Ballet, New York City
 1933: Agrippina Vaganova with Vladimir Dmitriev and Boris Asafyev – Kirov/Mariinsky Ballet (the former Imperial Ballet), Leningrad
 1934: Nicholas Sergeyev – Sadler's Wells Ballet (today's Birmingham Royal Ballet), London
 1936: Harald Lander – Royal Danish Ballet, Copenhagen (one act version)
 1940: Anton Dolin – Ballet Theatre (American Ballet Theatre), New York City
 1940: Willam Christensen – San Francisco Ballet, San Francisco
 1945: Fyodor Lopukhov – Kirov/Mariinsky Ballet, Leningrad
 1950: Konstantin Sergeyev – Kirov/Mariinsky Ballet, Leningrad
 1951: Asaf Messerer – Hungarian National Ballet, Budapest Opera
 1953: Vladimir Bourmeister – Stanislavsky Ballet, Moscow
 1960: George Balanchine – New York City Ballet (Lev Ivanov's second scene only, 1951), also Tschaikovsky Pas de Deux for City Ballet
 1963: Dimitri Bouchène – Paris Opera Ballet, Paris
 1963: John Cranko – Stuttgart Ballet, Stuttgart
 1963: Robert Helpmann with Sir Frederick Ashton – Royal Ballet, London
 1964: Rudolf Nureyev – Vienna State Opera Ballet, Vienna
 1967: David Blair for American Ballet Theatre, Chicago
 1967: Erik Bruhn – National Ballet of Canada, Toronto
 1976: Yuri Grigorovich – Ballet of the Bolshoi Theatre, Moscow
 1976: John Neumeier – Hamburg Ballet, Hamburg
 1977: Naima Baltacheyeva with Abdurahman Kumisnikov – Hungarian National Ballet, Budapest Opera
 1981: Mikhail Baryshnikov – American Ballet Theatre, Washington, D.C.
 1986: Rudolf Nureyev – Paris Opera Ballet, Paris
 1987: Anthony Dowell with Roland John Wiley – Royal Ballet, London
 1988: Natalia Kasatkina and Vladimir Vasilyov – Moscow Classical Ballet, Moscow
 1988: Rudi van Dantzig – Dutch National Ballet
 1988: Oleg Vinogradov – Kirov Ballet
 1992: Oleg Vinogradov – Universal Ballet
 1996: Peter Martins – Royal Danish Ballet
 1998: Peter Schaufuss – Peter Schaufuss Ballet, Holstebro
 1998:  – Saarländisches Staatstheater, Saarbrücken
 1999: Peter Martins – New York City Ballet
 2015: Nikolaj Hübbe and Silja Schandorff – Royal Danish Ballet
 2018: Liam Scarlett – The Royal Ballet

Swan Lake, List of major productions of, derived from its 1895 revival
Swan Lake